Events in the year 2021 in Sierra Leone.

Incumbents 

 President of Sierra Leone Julius Maada Bio

Events 

 Freetown fuel tanker explosion
COVID-19 pandemic in Sierra Leone

 
2020s in Sierra Leone
Years of the 21st century in Sierra Leone
Sierra Leone
Sierra Leone